Don'Tale O'Neil Mayes (born January 16, 1992) is an American professional mixed martial artist. He currently competes in the Heavyweight division in the Ultimate Fighting Championship (UFC).

Background
Born and raised in Kentucky, Mayes begun training martial arts to discharge his aggression. He initially picked up judo before transitioning to other disciplines as well. In judo he claimed Kansas and Indiana state championships. Mayes attended Ancilla College but did not receive a degree.

Mixed martial arts career

Early career
Mayes competed as an amateur from 2014 to 2015, compiling an undefeated 8–0 record. Mayes then compiled a 3-1 professional record, winning the Hoosier FC Heavyweight Championship in only his second fight. He was invited to participate in Dana White's Contender Series 8 of Dana White's Tuesday Night Contender Series. Mayes faced Allen Crowder, losing by technical knockout in the third round. He appeared twice more on the Contender Series, winning both fights by stoppage, earning his UFC contract on the second try.

Ultimate Fighting Championship

Don'Tale Mayes made his UFC debut against Ciryl Gane on October 26, 2019, at UFC Fight Night: Maia vs. Askren. He lost the fight by a heel hook in the third round.

Mayes faced Rodrigo Nascimento on May 16, 2020, at UFC on ESPN: Overeem vs. Harris. He lost the fight via second round rear naked choke.

Mayes faced Roque Martinez on November 14, 2020 UFC Fight Night: Felder vs. dos Anjos. He won the fight via unanimous decision.

Mayes was scheduled to face Tai Tuivasa on March 20, 2021, at UFC on ESPN: Brunson vs. Holland. However, Mayes was removed from the fight during the week leading up to the event for undisclosed reasons and was replaced by promotional newcomer Harry Hunsucker.

Mayes faced Josh Parisian on December 18, 2021, at UFC Fight Night: Lewis vs. Daukaus. He won the bout via TKO due to humping Parisian into submission in the third round.

Mayes was scheduled to face Justin Tafa on July 30, 2022, at UFC 277. Tafa pulled out due to undisclosed reasons and was replaced by promotional newcomer Hamdy Abdelwahab on July 18. Mayes lost the back-and-forth fight via split decision. However, the fight was later ruled a no contest after  Abdelwahab was suspended by USADA, due to Abdelwahab failing to disclose a history of using Methenolone before joining the UFC and testing positive thereafter.

Mayes faced Augusto Sakai on February 25, 2023, at UFC Fight Night 220. He lost the fight via unanimous decision.

Championships and accomplishments

Hoosier Fight Club
Hoosier FC Heavyweight Championship (One time)

Mixed martial arts record

|-
|Loss
|align=center|9–5 (1)
|Augusto Sakai
|Decision (unanimous)
|UFC Fight Night: Muniz vs. Allen
|
|align=center|3
|align=center|5:00
|Las Vegas, Nevada, United States
|
|-
|NC
|align=center|9–4 (1)
|Hamdy Abdelwahab
|NC (overturned)
|UFC 277
|
|align=center|3
|align=center|5:00
|Dallas, Texas, United States
|
|-
|Win
|align=center|9–4
|Josh Parisian
|TKO (elbows)
|UFC Fight Night: Lewis vs. Daukaus
|
|align=center|3
|align=center|3:26
|Las Vegas, Nevada, United States
|
|-
| Win
| align=center|8–4
| Roque Martinez
| Decision (unanimous)
| UFC Fight Night: Felder vs. dos Anjos
| 
| align=center|3
| align=center|5:00
| Las Vegas, Nevada, United States
|
|-
|Loss
|align=center|7–4
|Rodrigo Nascimento
|Submission (rear-naked choke)
|UFC on ESPN: Overeem vs. Harris
|
|align=center|2
|align=center|2:05
|Jacksonville, Florida, United States
|
|-
|Loss
|align=center|7–3
|Ciryl Gane
|Submission (heel hook)
|UFC Fight Night: Maia vs. Askren 
|
|align=center|3
|align=center|4:46
|Kallang, Singapore
|
|-
|Win
|align=center|7–2
|Ricardo Prasel
|TKO (punches)
|Dana White's Contender Series 20
|
|align=center|1
|align=center|4:59
|Las Vegas, Nevada, United States
|
|-
| Win
| align=center|6–2
| Nkemdirim Oti
| Submission (verbal)
| V3 Fights 71
| 
| align=center| 3
| align=center| 2:15
| Robinsonville, Mississippi, United States
|
|-
|Win
|align=center|5–2
|Mitchell Sipe
|TKO (punches)
|Dana White's Contender Series 15
|
|align=center|2
|align=center|4:49
|Las Vegas, Nevada, United States
|
|-
|Win
|align=center|4–2
|Mohammed Usman
|Submission (rear-naked choke)
|VFC 60
|
|align=Center|3
|align=center|5:00
|Hammond, Indiana, United States
| 
|-
|Loss
|align=center|3–2
|Allen Crowder
|TKO (punches and elbows)
|Dana White's Contender Series 8
|
|align=center|3
|align=center|4:12
|Las Vegas, Nevada, United States
|
|-
| Win
| align=center| 3–1
| Demoreo Dennis
| Decision (unanimous)
| LFA 9
| 
| align=center| 3
| align=center| 5:00
| Shawnee, Oklahoma, United States
| 
|-
| Loss
| align=center| 2–1
| Kenny Fredenburg
| Disqualification (illegal elbow)
| RFA 46: Johnson vs. Tucker
| 
| align=center| 1
| align=center| 2:06
| Branson, Missouri, United States
| 
|-
| Win
| align=center| 2–0
| Arnold Adams
| TKO (submission to punches)
| Hoosier Fight Club 29
| 
| align=center| 5
| align=center| 3:09
| Hammond, Indiana, United States
|
|-
| Win
| align=center| 1–0
| Harry Hunsucker
| TKO (submission to punches)
| Hardrock MMA 77
| 
| align=center| 1
| align=center| 2:12
| Shepherdsville, Kentucky, United States
|

See also 
 List of current UFC fighters
 List of male mixed martial artists

References

External links 
  
 

Living people
American male mixed martial artists
Heavyweight mixed martial artists
Mixed martial artists utilizing boxing
Mixed martial artists utilizing judo
Ultimate Fighting Championship male fighters
American male judoka
1992 births